Koiak 24 - Coptic Calendar - Koiak 26

The twenty-fifth day of the Coptic month of Koiak, the fourth month of the Coptic year. On a common year, this day corresponds to December 21, of the Julian Calendar, and January 3, of the Gregorian Calendar. This day falls in the Coptic season of Peret, the season of emergence. This day falls in the Nativity Fast.

Commemorations

Saints 

 The departure of Saint John Kame, the Priest 
 The departure of Saint Abshai, of Mount Toud

References 

Days of the Coptic calendar